Thomas Enqvist was the defending champion but lost in the first round to Raemon Sluiter.

Roger Federer won in the final 6–2, 7–6(8–6) against Jonas Björkman.

Seeds

  Roger Federer (champion)
  Jiří Novák (first round)
  Sébastien Grosjean (second round)
  Rainer Schüttler (withdrew because of an elbow injury)
  Younes El Aynaoui (first round)
  Yevgeny Kafelnikov (first round)
  Fabrice Santoro (first round)
  Tommy Robredo (first round)

Draw

Finals

Top half

Bottom half

External links
 2003 Open 13 Singles draw

Open 13
2003 ATP Tour